Grider Field , also known as Pine Bluff Regional Airport, is a municipal airport at Pine Bluff, Arkansas. It was established in 1941 as a U.S. Army Flight Training School operated by the Pine Bluff School of Aviation. After World War II, the city turned it into a commercial airport facility. It is a 850 acre facility consisting of a large terminal and restaurant, FAA weather monitoring equipment, private corporate hangars, fixed-base operators offering fuel and avionics services, a fire station, and aviation museum. It serves as the only ILS-equipped, jet capable airport in southeast Arkansas.

History

World War II

The airfield opened on March 22, 1941, with 6,300' x 6,380' open turf field. Under contract to the Pine Bluff School of Aviation, U.S. Army Air Corps aviation cadets trained there during World War II. It was named for J. McGavock Grider of Osceola and assigned to the U.S. Army Air Forces (USAAF) Gulf Coast Training Center, later known as Central Flying Training Command, as a primary pilot training airfield. It had five auxiliary airfields assigned for emergency and overflow landings. Primary training was conducted with Fairchild PT-19s. It also had PT-17 Stearmans and P-40 Warhawks. Flexible gunnery training was taught as well. The 2559th Army Air Forces Base Unit was inactivated on November 30, 1944, with the post-World War II drawdown of the USAAF Training Command's pilot training program.

Cold War and late 20th century
Grider Field was declared surplus and turned over to the Corps of Engineers on September 30, 1945. Transferred to the War Assets Administration, it returned to its former status an airport. Chicago and Southern DC-3s served the city from 1949 until 1953, when Trans-Texas took over. Texas International served the airport until 1975.

Facilities

Its single runway, 18/36, is 5,998 by 150 feet (1,828 x 46 m). In November 2007 it was announced that Grider Field would undergo renovation and modernization. In the year ending May 31, 2009 it had 39,875 aircraft operations, average 109 per day: 94% general aviation, 5% military and 1% air taxi. 50 aircraft were based at the airport: 84% single-engine, 12% multi-engine and 4% ultralight.

An original 2559th Army Air Forces Base Unit barracks is being painstakingly restored to its Pine Bluff School of Aviation era condition using historic records, oral history and authentic materials. When restoration is complete, the building will be a museum that houses a burgeoning collection of World War II aviation artifacts and memorabilia.

See also 
 List of airports in Arkansas

Notes

References

Further reading

 
 
 Manning, Thomas A. (2005), History of Air Education and Training Command, 1942–2002.  Office of History and Research, Headquarters, AETC, Randolph AFB, Texas 
 Shaw, Frederick J. (2004), Locating Air Force Base Sites, History’s Legacy, Air Force History and Museums Program, United States Air Force, Washington DC.

External links 

 Government
 
 
 General information
 Aerial image as of 16 February 1994 from USGS The National Map
 
 

1941 establishments in Arkansas
Airfields of the United States Army Air Forces in Arkansas
Airports established in 1941
Airports in Arkansas
Buildings and structures in Pine Bluff, Arkansas
Government buildings in Arkansas
Transportation in Jefferson County, Arkansas
USAAF Central Flying Training Command
USAAF Contract Flying School Airfields
Works Progress Administration in Arkansas